Tsat Tsz Mui Road is a road in Tsat Tsz Mui in Hong Kong. The road runs in the area of Tsat Tsz Mui and eastern North Point from west to east, parallel to King's Road, except disjoint by a residential-commercial complex of Island Place.

Name

The road named after the Tsat Tsz Mui, which means "seven sisters".

History
From 1911, the shore of Tsat Tsz Mui hosted bathing pavilions, including Hong Kong's largest. Another (apparently), opened by the South China Athletic Association in 1929, was destroyed by the Japanese occupiers in 1941 . In 1934, the Hong Kong Government began to develop Tsat Tsz Mui and a new road was built. Tsat Tsz Mui Road was completed on 15 December 1939. Starting with a short section between Kam Hong Street and Shu Kuk Street, the road was later extended to Model Housing Estate. The section was split into two when a bus depot was built between Tin Chiu Street and Kam Hong Street.

See also

 List of streets and roads in Hong Kong

Tsat Tsz Mui
Roads on Hong Kong Island